Giovanni Leone (3 November 1908 – 9 November 2001) was an Italian politician, jurist, and university professor. A founding member of the Christian Democracy (DC), Leone served as the President of Italy from December 1971 until June 1978. He also briefly served as Prime Minister of Italy from June to December 1963 and again from June to December 1968. He was also the president of the Chamber of Deputies from May 1955 until June 1963.

Leone was the first Italian president to resign for a scandal. In 1978, he was accused of bribery amid the Lockheed bribery scandals; however, the allegations were later declared false and Leone was completely rehabilitated.

Early years
Leone was born in Naples in 1908 to Mauro Leone and Maria Gioffredi, both from Pomigliano d'Arco, his father, Mauro Leone, was a prominent lawyer, and had participated in the foundation of the Italian People's Party in Campania. Leone grew up in Pomigliano d'Arco, where he attended the classic lyceum, graduating in 1924.

In 1929, he graduated in law from the prestigious University of Naples Federico II, with the thesis "Violation of family care obligations", which was even published in 1931. In the following year, he also obtained a degree in social and political science. During university, Leone became a member of Catholic Action (AC). After graduation, he started working in the law firm of Enrico De Nicola, also becoming a professor of criminal procedure at the University of Camerino.

During the 1930s, he became one of the most prominent lawyers and jurists in Southern Italy, teaching at the Universities of Messina, Bari and Naples. In these years, he was also elected president of the Italian section of the International Association of Penal Law, as well as a member of the executive committee.

During World War II, he became a magistrate of the military court of Naples, with the rank of lieutenant colonel. In the aftermath of September 1943 armistice, during the dramatic days of the Nazi occupation, he worked effectively for the release of numerous political prisoners and deserters, thus removing them from possible reprisals. In these years, thanks to a colleague, he met Vittoria Michitto, belonging to one of the best known families of Caserta, whom he married in July 1946. The couple had four sons: Mauro, Paolo, Giancarlo and Giulio, who died at the age of 4.

Political career

In 1943, along with his father, Leone was among the founders of the Christian Democracy (DC), the PPI's heir led by Alcide De Gasperi. After two years, in 1945, he was elected DC's provincial secretary for Naples, immediately becoming one of the leading figures of the party.

In 1946, Leone was among the main supporters of the "neutrality" in the 1946 institutional referendum, in which Italians voted to abolish the monarchy of the House of Savoy. In the same year, he was elected with nearly 32,000 votes to the Constituent Assembly for the constituency of Naples–Caserta. As a prominent jurist, he was appointed in the commission with the aim of drawing up the new republican constitution.

In April 1948, he was elected to the Chamber of Deputies with 60,000 votes. Even as a deputy, he continued working as a lawyer and teaching at the university, considering for a long time these occupations as priority aspects of his life. Also for this reason, according to some testimonies, he often expressed the desire not to take on government positions. Being able to count on his own reliable and territorially rooted electorate, Leone practically never conducted a real party activity. He remained substantially foreign to the large and small factions in which the DC quickly split up, although he could be considered close to the party's conservative wing.

President of the Chamber of Deputies

Thanks to his super partes position, the respect of all DC's internal factions, alongside the undoubted consideration gained also from the other political forces during the works of the Constituent Assembly, in 1950, Leone assumed the position of Vice President of the Chamber of Deputies and then, from May 1955, the one of President, which he held continuously until June 1963.

As president, he demonstrated, in addition to a strong sense of the institutions and a scrupulous respect for the rules of democratic confrontation, a remarkable ability to govern parliamentary dynamics, also mastered through that undeniable presence of spirit, contributed in making him a well-known figure in the public opinion. At the same time, he was able to gain approval for his action both within the party, which found him a reliable manager of parliamentary processes, and outside DC, among the majority's parties but also in the oppositions, which appreciated his qualities of institutional balance.

Prime Minister of Italy

First term
In the 1963 general election, the Christian Democrats lost almost one million votes, gaining nearly 38%, while the Italian Communist Party (PCI) arrived second with 25%. However the Italian Liberal Party (PLI) surged to 7%, their best results ever, receiving many votes from former Christian Democratic supporters, who were against Amintore Fanfani's centre-left policies. With the decline of electoral support, on 22 June 1963, the majority of DC members decided to replace Fanfani with a provisional government led by Leone.

Leone formed a one-party cabinet, composed only by DC's members and externally supported by Italian Socialist Party (PSI), Italian Republican Party (PRI) and Italian Democratic Socialist Party (PSDI). The cabinet was also known as "Bridge Government" (Governo ponte), as a transitional government, with the aim of starting a tighter cooperation with the PSI.

As Prime Minister, Leone had to face one of the most tragic events in Italian republican history, the Vajont Dam disaster. On 9 October 1963, a landslide occurred on Monte Toc, in the province of Pordenone. In the previous months, the Adriatic Society of Electricity (SADE) and the Italian government, which both owned the dam, dismissed evidence and concealed reports describing the geological instability of Monte Toc on the southern side of the basin and other early warning signs reported prior to the disaster.

Immediately after the disaster, government and local authorities insisted on attributing the tragedy to an unexpected and unavoidable natural event. However, numerous warnings, signs of danger, and negative appraisals had been disregarded in the previous months and the eventual attempt to safely control the landslide into the lake by lowering its level came when the landslide was almost imminent and was too late to prevent it. The communist newspaper L'Unità was the first to denounce the actions of management and government. Leone accused the PCI of political profiteering from the tragedy, promising to bring justice to the people killed in the disaster. However, a few months after the end of his premiership, he became the head of SADE's team of lawyers, who significantly reduced the amount of compensation for the survivors and ruled out payment for at least 600 victims.

In December 1963, after only five months of government, when the congress of the PSI authorized a full engagement of the party into the government, Leone resigned and Aldo Moro, the secretary of the DC and leader of the more leftist wing of the party, became the new Prime Minister, ruling Italy for more than four years.

1964 presidential election
In August 1964, President Antonio Segni suffered a serious cerebral hemorrhage while he was working at the presidential palace; he only partially recovered and decided to resign. Leone was selected as the DC's official candidate for the presidency, but Fanfani decided to run against him. However, neither Fanfani nor Leone succeeded in being elected, in fact, during the 1964 presidential election, the social-democratic leader Giuseppe Saragat succeeded in gaining the majority of votes.

In August 1967, Leone was appointed Senator for Life by President Saragat.

Second term

In June 1968, after the general election, Saragat appointed Leone at the head of the government. As his first cabinet, also the second one was composed only by DC members and externally supported by PSU and PRI.

In November 1968, the Parliament approved a law that introduced a special benefit for full unemployment for workers in the industrial sector, in cases of total or partial closing down of enterprises or large-scale dismissals, equalling two-thirds of previous monthly earnings for 180 days. The law also extended earnings replacement benefits to cases of sectoral crises or industrial restructuring with a new compensation formula equaling 80% of previous earnings for 3 months (9 months in exceptional circumstances), allowed for family allowances to be paid to those in receipt of unemployment benefits.

Leone's second premiership lasted only seven months. In December 1968, he resigned and Mariano Rumor became the new Prime Minister.

President (1971–1978)

In 1971, Amintore Fanfani was proposed as Christian Democracy's candidate for the Presidency of the Republic. However his candidacy was weakened by the divisions within his own party and the candidacy of the socialist Francesco De Martino, who received votes from PCI, PSI and some PSDI members. Fanfani retired after several unsuccessful ballots and, at the twenty-second round, Leone was selected as the Christian democratic candidate for the presidency, being slightly preferred to Aldo Moro. At the twenty third round he was finally elected with a centre-right majority, with 518 votes out of 996, including those of the neo-fascist Italian Social Movement (MSI). Leone's majority was the narrowest one ever obtained by an elected President and with twenty-three rounds of voting the 1971 presidential election remains still today the longest presidential election in the Italian republican history.

Leone's presidency was considered quite revolutionary for the role held by his wife, Vittoria. Before her, the wife of the Italian presidents had always been on the sidelines, not involved in the Italian political life. However, Vittoria Leone completely changed this role and had been widely regarded as the most prominent first lady of the Italian Republic.

During his presidency, he had to face an extremely complex political and social situation. Already in the first months of the seven-year term, he had to approve the early dissolution of the Chambers, for the first time since the birth of the Republic. This decision was taken by Leone with the approval of most of the political parties, but it was accompanied by the choice to entrust the management of the electoral phase, not to the resigning coalition government of Emilio Colombo, but to a one-party government led by Giulio Andreotti. For this choice, Leone was heavily criticised by the opposition. With a total of 152 votes in favor and 158 against, the government did not gain the confidence of the Senate and was forced to resign after only 9 days.

After Andreotti's resignation in July 1973, Leone gave to Mariano Rumor the task of forming a new centre-left cabinet, which however lasted only a year, when, in November, Aldo Moro became once again Prime Minister. During Moro's two-years rule, the DC tried to open a dialogue with the PCI of Enrico Berlinguer, in a political phase known as Historic Compromise, with the aim of bringing the communists into the government's majority. Leone, as a member of the party's right-wing, did not approve Moro's move, however he never openly opposed it.

Kidnapping of Aldo Moro

On the morning of 16 March 1978, the day on which the new Andreotti's cabinet was supposed to have undergone a confidence vote in the Italian Parliament, the car of Aldo Moro, then-president of the Christian Democracy, was assaulted by a group of Red Brigades (BR) in Via Fani in Rome. Firing automatic weapons, the terrorists killed Moro's bodyguards (two Carabinieri in Moro's car and three policemen in the following car) and kidnapped him.

During the kidnapping, Leone was in favour of a negotiation with the terrorists, while Prime Minister Andreotti strongly opposed it: the BR proposed an exchange of prisoners to the Italian government, which was supported by Leone, but Andreotti refused. During his imprisonment, Moro wrote a statement expressing very harsh judgements against Andreotti. On 9 May 1978, Moro's body was found in the trunk of a Renault 4 in Via Caetani, after 55 days of imprisonment, during which Moro was submitted to a political trial by the so-called "people's court" set up by the Red Brigades.

Lockheed scandal and resignation
Leone's political career came to an end in 1978 due to the Lockheed bribery scandal. The allegations came from the United States and were supported by the Italian political magazine L'Espresso. According to the allegations, Lockheed bribed many high-profile politicians in Italy to purchase Hercules Aircraft for the military. Leone and his family were allegedly implicated in the bribery.

In June 1978, after months of polemics, Leone resigned as President of the Republic. However, the accusations were never proved and the most prominent of his accusers was convicted of libel three times.

Death and legacy

After his resignation, Leone continued sitting in the Parliament as a Senator for life. Moreover, through writings and interviews, as well as judgments, he also had the opportunity to reaffirm and stress the correctness of his acts as President and the unreliability of the accusations moved against his family and him. In addition, several of those politicians who had attacked him most during the presidency, also had the opportunity of apologizing to him. Among these, the radical leaders Marco Pannella and Emma Bonino, who on the occasion of Leone's 90th birthday, openly expressed their regrets.

On 25 September 2001, just a few weeks before his 93rd birthday, a decree by the Prime Minister awarded Leone of the title of President Emeritus of the Republic; the office would be later applied to all the future former presidents.
 
Giovanni Leone died in Rome, on 9 November 2001, at his villa on the Via Cassia. On 25 November 2006, President Giorgio Napolitano stated that the Senate had granted full recognition of the correctness of Leone's actions, completely rehabilitating his political actions.

Leone was portrayed as a key antagonist in the 2020 film Rose Island, which tells the story of the Republic of Rose Island and the Government's attempts to destroy it. Leone was played in the film by Luca Zingaretti.

Electoral history

Presidential elections

References

External links

1908 births
2001 deaths
Politicians from Naples
Italian Roman Catholics
Christian Democracy (Italy) politicians
Presidents of Italy
Prime Ministers of Italy
Members of the Constituent Assembly of Italy
Presidents of the Chamber of Deputies (Italy)
Deputies of Legislature I of Italy
Deputies of Legislature II of Italy
Deputies of Legislature III of Italy
Deputies of Legislature IV of Italy
Italian life senators
Italian military personnel of World War II
Grand Crosses 1st class of the Order of Merit of the Federal Republic of Germany
Lockheed bribery scandals
University of Naples Federico II alumni